Rodney Carter Miller (January 16, 1940 – November 8, 2013) was an American professional baseball player who played in one game in Major League Baseball for the  Brooklyn Dodgers when he was 17 years old. Born in Portland, Oregon, he signed with Brooklyn after graduating from high school in Lynwood, California.

Miller had spent 1957 in the Class C Illinois–Indiana–Iowa League before his recall to the Dodgers after rosters were expanded to 40 men post-September 1. In his one MLB game, on September 28, 1957, he pinch hit for Randy Jackson in the top of the ninth inning against relief pitcher Jack Meyer of the Philadelphia Phillies, and struck out. The game, played at Connie Mack Stadium, was won by the Dodgers 8–4. It was the second-to-last game in Brooklyn Dodger history. Weeks after the 1957 regular season ended on September 29, the team moved to Los Angeles for the  campaign.

Although the Dodgers' new home was minutes from Miller's high school alma mater, he never again appeared for them after 1957. Miller played three more years in the lower reaches of the Dodgers' farm system, leaving baseball after the 1960 campaign to join the United States Marine Corps, where he served for four years. He lived for 21 years in Reno, Nevada, before retiring to Cascade, Idaho, in 2009.

References

External links

1940 births
2013 deaths
Baseball players from Portland, Oregon
Brooklyn Dodgers players
Cedar Rapids Raiders players
Columbus Foxes players
Great Falls Electrics players
Kokomo Dodgers players
People from Cascade, Idaho
People from Lynwood, California
Reno Silver Sox players
Sportspeople from Reno, Nevada
Thomasville Dodgers players
United States Marines